Kalino may refer to:
Kalino, Bulgaria, a village in Bulgaria
Kalino, Poland, a village in Łódź Voivodeship, Poland
Kalino, Russia, name of several inhabited localities in Russia